Letícia Stephanie Lima da Costa (born April 20, 1995) is a Brazilian artistic gymnast. She competed at the 2015 World Artistic Gymnastics Championships only on Floor Exercise for the team qualification.

References 

Living people
1995 births
Brazilian female artistic gymnasts
Gymnasts at the 2015 Pan American Games
Pan American Games bronze medalists for Brazil
Pan American Games medalists in gymnastics
South American Games gold medalists for Brazil
South American Games silver medalists for Brazil
South American Games medalists in gymnastics
Competitors at the 2010 South American Games
Medalists at the 2015 Pan American Games
21st-century Brazilian women
20th-century Brazilian women